Coneyhurst Cutting is a  geological Site of Special Scientific Interest south-east of Billingshurst in West Sussex. It is a Geological Conservation Review site.

The layer contains the fossils of large Viviparus (freshwater river snails) preserved in three dimensions.

The site is a road verge which is covered with scrub and trees and no geology is visible.

References

Sites of Special Scientific Interest in West Sussex
Geological Conservation Review sites